Claude Roumain (born 29 July 1961) is a former Haitian sprinter who competed in the men's 100m competition at the 1992 Summer Olympics. He recorded an 11.07, not enough to qualify for the next round past the heats. His personal best is 10.20, set in 1993. In 1992, he additionally ran the 200m, timed at 22.51. He also competed in the 1988 Summer Olympics in the 100m and 200m events.200m personal best 20.6

References

1961 births
Haitian male sprinters
Athletes (track and field) at the 1987 Pan American Games
Athletes (track and field) at the 1988 Summer Olympics
Athletes (track and field) at the 1992 Summer Olympics
Olympic athletes of Haiti
Pan American Games competitors for Haiti
Living people